Flood Forecasting and Warning Centre is a government agency that generates and forecasts floods in Bangladesh and is located in Dhaka, Bangladesh. The centre is an important part the government mechanism that deals with Flooding in Bangladesh.

History
Flood Forecasting and Warning Centre was established in 1972 under Bangladesh Water Development Board. It is under the Ministry of Water Resources. The centre has 56 water level monitoring stations throughout Bangladesh.

References

Government agencies of Bangladesh
1972 establishments in Bangladesh
Emergency management in Bangladesh
Organisations based in Dhaka
Floods in Bangladesh
Water management authorities in Bangladesh